William Sloane may refer to:

 William Douglas Sloane (1844–1915), American businessman, sportsman, philanthropist
 William Milligan Sloane (1850–1928), American educator and historian
 William A. Sloane (1854–1930), American judge
 William Sloane (author) (1906–1974), American writer

See also
 William Sloan (disambiguation)
 William Sloane Coffin (1924–2006), liberal Christian clergyman